Jackson Fernando de Sousa (born 18 August 1990 in São José, Santa Catarina), known as Jackson, is a Brazilian footballer who plays for Camboriú as a midfielder.

Career statistics

References

External links

Jackson at ZeroZero

1990 births
Living people
Brazilian footballers
Association football midfielders
Campeonato Brasileiro Série A players
Campeonato Brasileiro Série B players
Campeonato Brasileiro Série C players
Figueirense FC players
ABC Futebol Clube players
Esporte Clube Santo André players
Ypiranga Futebol Clube players
River Atlético Clube players
Camboriú Futebol Clube players